Andrew Dickson is a composer.

Andrew Dickson may also refer to:
Andrew Flinn Dickson (1825–1879), American minister and author
Andy Dickson, musician in The Narcs
Andrew Dickson (politician)

See also

Andrew Dixon (disambiguation)